William Davis Allison (1861 – April 1, 1923) was an American lawman. He served as lieutenant in the service of the Arizona Rangers from 1903 to 1904.

Biography 
Allison was born in Ohio. He moved to Texas for which Allison was a cowboy and wrangler. He was sharp and liked by people for which he was nominated to become sheriff in Midland County, Texas. His nomination become successful for which Allison was marked as the youngest sheriff in Texas, in 1888. He served as the sheriff for ten years. Allison then served as the city marshal in Roswell, New Mexico. In 1903, he was hired by the second captain of the Arizona Rangers, Thomas H. Rynning to become an Arizona ranger. He served as lieutenant. Allison had previously served as a inspector in the Texas Cattle Raisers for three years. He then served as deputy sheriff in Chaves County, New Mexico.

Allison allegedly had killed Jack Dunlop in a train robbery in Fairbank, Arizona. He also seized two brothers who were outlaws. Allison had retired as a lieutenant for the Arizona Rangers in 1904, in which he settled in Texas. With settling in Texas, he extinguished Pascal Morosco. Allison specified as a "Special Texas Ranger", in 1917. He worked along with inspector, Horace L. Roberson on an examination. In 1923, they've both had to attend a grand jury for which they had both conferred evidence against their suspects, but it never happened. They both had met their attorneys at the Gaines Hotel for which in a while their suspects Milt Good and Tom Ross had carried a shotgun and a pistol. Allison and Roberson were both killed by their suspects, in which Allison's body was on the floor in April 1923 in Seminole, Texas. Roberson's wife had heard the shooting.

References

External links 
 
 Legendary Lawman William "Dave" Allison
 William Davis “Dave” Allison – Lifetime Lawman
 Field Inspector William Davis "Dave" Allison

1861 births
1923 deaths
People from Ohio
Arizona Rangers
Cowboys
Texas sheriffs
American town marshals
American deputy sheriffs
People murdered in Texas
American murder victims
Male murder victims
1923 murders in the United States
Deaths by firearm in Texas